Fleckenberg is a locality in the municipality Schmallenberg in the district Hochsauerlandkreis in North Rhine-Westphalia, Germany.

The village has 1544 inhabitants and lies in the west of the municipality of Schmallenberg at a height of around 354 m on the Bundesstraße 236. The river Latrop flows in Fleckenberg in the river Lenne. 

Fleckenberg borders on the villages of Schmallenberg, Jagdhaus, Waidmannsruh, Wulwesort, Latrop, Harbecke, Werpe and Lenne.

Gallery

External links 
Fleckenberg.info

References

Villages in North Rhine-Westphalia
Schmallenberg